James River High School is located in northwestern Chesterfield County, Virginia, United States. James River is a part of Chesterfield County Public Schools.

Academics 
JRHS ranks among America's top 3000 schools, Virginia's top 70, Richmond Metro Area's top 10, and 3rd best performing high school in Chesterfield County Public Schools out of their 11 high schools. 43% of students participate in AP classes. The graduation rate is 94%.

Athletics
James River sponsors the following sports teams: croquet, baseball, basketball (men's and women's), crew (men's and women's), cross country (men's and women's), field hockey, American football, golf, lacrosse (men's and women's), soccer (men's and women's), softball, tennis (men's and women's), track and field (men's and women's), volleyball (men's and women's), swimming and wrestling. The school also supports a crew team which competes in the Virginia Scholastic Championships.

The athletic department is currently sponsored by Adidas.

James River's rivals include Midlothian, and Cosby. The James River and Midlothian rivalry is a classic, especially in American football, where the two schools in the annual "Coal Bowl". Only six miles apart, the schools are considered "cross town rivals".

The men's volleyball program is among the most successful at the school and in the state. They have won five state championships, more than any other school in Virginia, and have won back to back state championships on two separate occasions. Their state championship seasons are 2010, 2011, 2015, 2016, and 2018. They were runner-up in 2014.

Notable volleyball alumni include Darren Kilby, Sam Albus, and Mitchell Ford. All of whom were state and regional players of the year in 2010, 2011, and 2012 respectively.

The James River baseball team won in 2007 and 2008 the Group AAA State Baseball Championship. In 2008 the Rapids were ranked 19th in the nation in High School Baseball. In 2011 the team had another run at the state championship but lost in the semi-finals. They are considered one of the top high schools in Virginia baseball. Consistently ranking top 200 in the Nation and top 10 in Virginia.

In 2008 the men's golf team won its first championship in 2008 VHSL Group AAA State Championship.

In 2013 the men's golf team would win the championship. They would go onto winning three consecutive championships in 2014 and 2015.

The women's cross country team won the Group AAA State Championship in 2002.

In 2011 the men's basketball team won the AAA championship to ESPN World Wide of Sports Regional High school Invitational Basketball Tournament in Orlando Florida. It was featured on ESPN 3 and featured some of the top AAA high school teams in America.

In 2002, the women's field hockey team won the State Championship in overtime against Lake Braddock 3-2.

In 2016, the men's lacrosse team made it to State Championship but lost. They were ranked #10 overall in Virginia.

The Women's volleyball team had its best season in 2012, when Kari Heavenrich has several spectacular performances.

The school also has men's and women's lacrosse teams, which were the first public high school lacrosse teams in the Central Region.

Notable alumni
Nathan Kirby – professional baseball player
Alex McMurtry - college Gymnast
Nick Taitague - former professional soccer player
Shannon Taylor - Olympic Field Hockey Player
Kellie Wells – Olympic hurdler
Nick Mira - Multi-platinum producer and songwriter
Vinnie Pasquantino – professional baseball player

Specialty Center
James River High School is home to the specialty center for Leadership and International Relations. The program was founded in 2002.

Enrollment in Leadership and International relations 
The James River High School Center for Leadership and International Relations has up to 350 applicants per a year, and only about 50 are accepted.

References

External links 
 James River High School website
 Chesterfield County Public Schools website

Public high schools in Virginia
Schools in Chesterfield County, Virginia